Normandie may refer to:

Places
 Normandy, the geographical and cultural region in North-west Europe called Normandie in French
 Normandy (administrative region), the administrative region of France, also called in French Normandie
 Normandie, New Brunswick, a community in Weldford Parish, New Brunswick, Canada
 Normandie, New Jersey, a community in Monmouth County, New Jersey, United States
 Normandie Avenue, Los Angeles County, California, United States
 Zec Normandie, a Controlled harvesting zone in the Laurentides administrative region, Quebec, Canada

Military
 Normandie-Niemen a French Air Force squadron that served on the Eastern Front of World War II
 Régiment de Normandie, a Royalist French army unit created in 1616

Ships
 French ship Normandie (1835), a Seine ferry built at Le Havre in 1835
 French ironclad Normandie, in service 1862–71
 Normandie-class battleship, five ships planned for use by the French Navy in World War I but never completed
 SS Normandie, an ocean liner in service 1935–39
 MV Normandie, a channel ferry built in 1992

Other uses
 The Normandie Hotel, a hotel in San Juan, Puerto Rico, inspired by the SS Normandie
 Hotel Normandie, Los Angeles, California, United States
 Normandie, side project of the band TheSTART
 Normandie Apartments, Omaha, Nebraska, USA
 Normandie Apartments, Shanghai, China

See also
 Normandy (disambiguation)